Philip Triplett (December 24, 1799 – March 30, 1852) was a U.S. Representative from Kentucky.

Born in Madison County, Kentucky, Triplett attended the common schools of central Kentucky near Franklin, and in Scott County.
He studied law in Owensboro, Kentucky.
He was admitted to the bar and commenced practice in Owensboro in 1824.
He served as member of the State house of representatives in 1824.

Triplett was elected as a Whig to the Twenty-sixth and Twenty-seventh Congresses (March 3, 1839 – March 3, 1843).
He was not a candidate for reelection in 1842.
He served as delegate to the State constitutional convention in 1849.
He died in Owensboro, Kentucky, March 30, 1852.
He was interred in Rosehill Elmwood Cemetery.

References

1799 births
1852 deaths
Whig Party members of the United States House of Representatives from Kentucky
19th-century American politicians
Members of the Kentucky House of Representatives